Hasan Kwame Jeffries is a history professor and author at Ohio State University. He is the brother of Congressman Hakeem Jeffries, the House Minority Leader of the United States Congress. He is the nephew of Leonard Jeffries, a former professor at City College of New York.

He was born in the Borough of Brooklyn in New York City and graduated summa cum laude from Morehouse College with a B.A. in history in 1994. He became a member of the Pi Chapter of Kappa Alpha Psi fraternity. He received a PhD in American history with a specialization in African American history from Duke University in 2002 and taught for a year at the University of Alabama in Tuscaloosa before joining Ohio State's faculty in 2003. His profile page also states he was the lead historian and primary scriptwriter for the $27 million renovation of the National Civil Rights Museum at the Lorraine Hotel in Memphis, Tennessee from 2010 to 2014 and worked on the PBS documentary Black America Since MLK. He hosts a podcast called "Teaching Hard History" for the Southern Poverty Law Center's educational division, Teaching Tolerance.

He was interviewed by NPR about how history is taught in American schools. He has appeared on C-SPAN several times, including as an author and discussing current events and history. In 2010 he lectured at Swarthmore College on the Student Nonviolent Coordinating Committee (SNCC).

He wrote a book about the struggle for Civil Rights in Lowndes County, Alabama.

Written work
Bloody Lowndes: Civil Rights and Black Power in Alabama’s Black Belt
Understanding and Teaching the Civil Rights Movement, editor, a collection of essays by civil rights scholars and teachers

References

External links

Year of birth missing (living people)
Living people
African-American historians
Historians from New York (state)
21st-century African-American writers
American male non-fiction writers
Ohio State University faculty
21st-century American historians